Jonas Björkman was the defending champion, but lost in the second round this year.

Todd Martin won the tournament, beating Thomas Johansson in the final, 6–3, 6–4, 6–4.

Seeds

Draw

Finals

Top half

Bottom half

External links
 Main draw

1998 Stockholm Open
1998 ATP Tour